Below is a list with each Secretary General of the Organization of the Petroleum Exporting Countries (OPEC), based on the organization's official publications. The Secretary General is OPEC's chief executive officer.

References

Secretaries General of OPEC
List
Secretaries-general